José Manuel Fabio, (born 31 December 1977) is a Paraguayan professional basketball player.  He currently plays for the Comunicaciones Mercedes Sports Club of the Torneo Nacional de Ascenso in Argentina.

He has been a member of the Paraguayan national basketball team and participated at the 2014 South American Basketball Championship, where he averaged most minutes, points, rebounds and blocks for his team.

References

External links
FIBA Profile (2014 South America Championship)
Latinbasket.com Profile
Opera Sports Profile

1977 births
Living people
Paraguayan men's basketball players
Sportspeople from Asunción
Small forwards
Power forwards (basketball)
Argentine emigrants to Paraguay
Club Comunicaciones (Mercedes) basketball players